Leal Douglas (born Lilly Elizabeth Annie Lamb; 25 March 1881 – 3 February 1970) was a British-Australian actress, mainly of the silent film era.

Of Scottish and English parents, Douglas emigrated to Australia as a child and began her stage career there. She took her own company to South Africa, then returned to England for her main film career, during which she had some leading roles. In 1927, she went back to Australia, where she resumed her stage career, and then in the 1940s again returned to England.

Life
Douglas was born in March 1881, the daughter of Mary Ann Emily and Richard Douglas Lamb, a musician originally from Scotland, the son of another Richard Lamb, also a musician. Her mother was from the village of Chalford in Gloucestershire, and her parents had been married in Salford in May 1880. In December 1881, their daughter was christened Lilly Elizabeth Annie at St Thomas's Church, Pendleton, in Eccles.

Douglas's family emigrated to Australia, where she spent most of her childhood, and on leaving school she became a stage actress. She adopted the stage name Leal Douglas and made her debut under the management of J. C. Williamson, one of her earliest appearances being as Barbara Hare in a George Marlow 1909 stage production of East Lynne. Other work was with Annette Kellerman and Julius Knight. In 1905, she and her parents were living in Oxley, Queensland, a suburb of Brisbane. On 11 October 1906, Douglas's parents announced her engagement to Frederick William Chapman, of Murphy's Creek, Churchill, Queensland, and on 24 October they were married. Her husband died in 1923 at the age of 47.

In December 1912, Douglas was touring with Aubrey Mallalieu in a piece called "Feed the Brute". After a long tour of Australia and New Zealand, she and Mallalieu formed a company of their own and took it to South Africa. While there, she saw that her friend Annette Kellerman was starring in a film, and wondered if one day they might appear together. In May 1913, Douglas and Mallalieu travelled together on the SS Ballarat to England, which in Douglas's view had at that time "world mastery of the film industry". On arrival in London, Douglas got an introduction to Florence Turner's manager and was given her first part in a film, The Rose of Surrey (1913). Her other early film work included Sixty Years a Queen (1913) and The Lure of London (1914).

In 1917, Douglas starred as Milady de Winter in a little-known film version of The Three Musketeers.

 
Another of Douglas's starring roles was in The Beetle (1919), based on the novel by Richard Marsh, in which she played an Egyptian princess who can transform herself into a man or a beetle and uses her powers to wreak revenge. A review commented "There are few vampires in the English screen world, and perhaps of these Miss Leal Douglas is the most beautiful." Jonathan Rigby has called Douglas's part in the film "the polymorphous title role".

After appearing in British films for fourteen years, latterly as a character actress, in November 1927 Douglas returned to Brisbane by the Orient Line's RMS Ormonde, wishing to visit her family. She commented to the press that America had gained supremacy in films thanks to the war, and that England was now bidding to get it back, although hampered by "the insufficiency of studios", which were hired out for only three weeks. She had recently featured in a film made in Nice and Corsica and was an admirer of the German film Metropolis (1927).

In Australia, Douglas returned to working on stage, and appeared in several productions between 1928 and 1944. She also had parts in the Australian films The Cheaters (made 1929, released 1930), The Hayseeds (1933), The Silence of Dean Maitland (1934), and Harvest Gold (1945).

In 1932, Douglas was living in East Sydney, New South Wales, in 1937 in Wentworth, and in 1943 was in East Sydney again. Her father died in 1933, and her mother in 1937, in Sydney.

By 1949, Douglas was back in England and working on stage in a production of J. B. Priestley's The Linden Tree. She remained in Britain and had minor parts in films there in the early 1950s. She died in February 1970, aged 88, while living in Warwick Avenue, Little Venice, Maida Vale, London, and left an estate valued at £1,393, (£ as of ).

Filmography
The Rose of Surrey (1913), as Mrs Moore
Sixty Years a Queen (1913), uncredited
The Lure of London (1914), as Lady Westbury
Girl of My Heart (1915)
The Three Musketeers (1917), as Milady de Winter
Thelma (1918), as Blonde
Deception (1918)
What a Life! (1918), as Mrs Box
Kiss Me! (1919), as Mrs Wick
The Beetle (1919), as High Priestess
The Lamp of Destiny (1919)
Darby and Joan (1920), as Mrs Gorry
Nothing Else Matters (1920), as Tiny Higgs
Belphegor the Mountebank (1921), as Catherine
The Uninvited Guest (1923), as Baines
The Fair Maid of Perth (1923)
Dixon's Return (1924), as Mrs Dixon
The Gold Cure (1925), as Lady Dunacre
London Love (1926), as Mrs Hope
Every Mother's Son (1926), as Lady Browning 
Carry On (1927), as Mrs Trevorn 
Passion Island (1927), as Desirée
Somewhat Good (1927)
The Cheaters, as the Lady (1930)
 The Hayseeds (1933)
The Silence of Dean Maitland (1934), as Mrs Lee
Harvest Gold (1945), as Mrs McDougal
Little Big Shot (1952)
Johnny on the Run (1953)

Notes

External links

Leal Douglas at bfi.org.uk

1881 births
1970 deaths
20th-century Australian actresses
Actresses from Salford
19th-century Australian women
English emigrants to Australia
English people of Scottish descent
Australian people of Scottish descent
20th-century English actresses
People from Eccles, Greater Manchester